Rose State College is a public community college in Midwest City, Oklahoma.

History
Rose State College was originally named Oscar Rose Junior College in memory of Oscar V. Rose, a former Mid-Del School District school superintendent.

The school was renamed Rose State College by Senate Bill Number 9 in April 1983 that went into effect on November 1, 1983.

Rose State College offered its first classes on September 21, 1970. Voters in Midwest City, Del City, and portions of southeastern and northeastern Oklahoma City approved the college district in 1968. This vote followed passage of Senate Bill Number 2 in 1967, a law enabling district-operated community colleges to receive state aid. Voters then passed a $1.75 million general obligation bond issue, a two-mill levy for operating expenses in 1969, and a three-mill levy for operations in 1970. In December 1973, the junior college became a member of The Oklahoma State System of Higher Education, after approval from the Rose State College Board of Trustees. Rose State College exists as a publicly created and sustained, open-admissions, associate degree-granting college to provide comprehensive lower-division programs of higher education and related community services. To meet enrollment growth, the Communication Center was built in 1998, providing art, music, and journalism classrooms as well as a home for theatrical and musical performances. Part of the college was destroyed by a tornado on May 3, 1999; some of the damage in this area was rated high-end F4 on the Fujita scale, although F5 was considered. Popularity of the dental hygiene and dental assistant programs led to the construction of the Health Sciences Annex, completed in 2001. Rose State College has grown from an initial enrollment of 1,700 in 1970 to a regular fall enrollment of approximately 8,200.

Academics

Rose State offers scholarships to students including Leadership Scholarships and the Ticket to Rose Program.
Ticket to Rose provides free tuition and mandatory fees for graduates of Midwest City High School, Carl Albert High School, Choctaw High School, Del City High School, and Star Spencer High School.

Student life
Rose State's colors are blue and gold, and their mascot is the Raider, based on Doolittle's Raiders, best known for leading a bombing run on Tokyo on April 18, 1942, shortly following the bombing of Pearl Harbor, Hawaii, marking the U.S. entry into World War II. The college serves hundreds of military personnel each year due to its proximity to Tinker Air Force Base. The college runs a student newspaper, entitled The 15th Street News, and hosts a number of community events throughout the year. On the campus of Rose State is "The Village," a complex of apartment-style housing capable of accommodating up to 180 students.

References

External links 
Official website

OK Cooperative Alliance
Educational institutions established in 1970
1970 establishments in Oklahoma
Education in Oklahoma County, Oklahoma
Buildings and structures in Oklahoma County, Oklahoma
Midwest City, Oklahoma
Community colleges in Oklahoma